St. Cuthbert's beads (or Cuddy's beads) are fossilised portions of the "stems" of crinoids from the Carboniferous period. Crinoids are a kind of marine echinoderm which are still extant, and which are sometimes known as "sea lilies". These bead-like fossils are washed out onto the beach and in medieval Northumberland were strung together as necklaces or rosaries, and became associated with St Cuthbert.

In other parts of England, circular crinoid columnals were known as "fairy money."  Pentagonal crinoid columnals were known as "star stones", and moulds of the stems left impressions which were known as screwstones. In Germany, the columnals were known as Bonifatius pfennige (St Boniface's pennies) and in America they are known as Indian beads.

Palaeontology
The "beads" are thick discs or short cylinders, which, when the crinoid was still alive, were articulated to form a branched structure, linked by soft tissue, nerves and ligaments which occupied the central hole (lumen).   
The columnals usually became disarticulated after the animal died. Articulated crinoid fossils are relatively rare, but disarticulated columnals are quite common in the fossil record.  They may be extracted from their matrix (often limestone) or, in the case of exposures in coastal cliffs, they can sometimes be found washed out of the matrix and deposited on the foreshore, as if from the sea.

History
In mediaeval Northumberland, the fossilised columnals were collected at Lindisfarne, and strung together as a necklace or rosary.  Over time, they became associated with St. Cuthbert, who was a monk on Lindisfarne and the nearby island of Hobthrush (also known as St Cuthbert's Isle) in the 7th century and became Bishop of Lindisfarne.  According to legend, it was said that St. Cuthbert used the beads as a rosary, or that his spirit created them on stormy nights so they could be found on the beach the next morning.  Lane and Ausich (2001) suggest that the beads were not associated with St. Cuthbert before the 12th century, and may have become popular after a limestone quarry came into operation on Lindisfarne in the 14th century.

The first known reference to Cuthbert's beads in a documentary source is found in an account of a visit to Lindisfarne by a John Ray in 1671:

 
At the time, the origin and nature of the "beads" was not well known.  The peculiar stones were categorized with "Devil's toenails" (Gryphaea shells), "snakestones" (ammonites), "St Peter's fingers" or "Devil's fingers" or "thunderbolts" (belemnites); although by 1673, Martin Lister hypothesised that crinoids were "plants petrified".

The term "St Cuthbert's beads" became a common way of referring to crinoid columnals from the 17th century onwards, and is a term which is still used occasionally in palaeontological writings.

In literature
In Sir Walter Scott's poem Marmion, written in 1808, St. Cuthbert is described (by fishermen) as creating these bead-like fossils at Lindisfarne, Northumberland. The poem also makes reference to St. Hilda of Whitby, Yorkshire who, according to religious legend, turned snakes into stone, the "snake stones" being the numerous fossil ammonites of that area.

See also
Indian beads, term for the same fossils in the United States

References

Fossil Folklore: St Cuthbert's Beadsfrom the Natural History Museum, London 
Fossil Folklore: Crinoids from the Natural History Museum, London (including illustration)
The Legend of St. Cuthbert's Beads; A Palaeontological and Geological Perspective, N. Gary Lane, William I. Ausich. Folklore, Vol. 112, No. 1 (April 2001), pp. 65–73

English folklore
Northumbrian folklore
Prehistoric crinoids

de:Seelilien und Haarsterne#Fossile Crinoiden